was a district located in Hyōgo Prefecture, Japan.

As of 2005, the district had an estimated population of 11,500, and the total area was 58.21 km2.

Former towns and villages
 Awaji
 Goshiki
 Higashiura
 Hokudan
 Ichinomiya
 Tsuna

Mergers
 On April 1, 2005 - the former town of Awaji absorbed the towns of Higashiura, Hokudan, Ichinomiya and Tsuna to create the city of Awaji.
 On February 11, 2006 - the town of Goshiki was merged into the expanded city of Sumoto. Tsuna District was dissolved as a result of this merger.

Former districts of Hyōgo Prefecture